Quinn Purnell Porter (born February 2, 1986) is a gridiron football running back for the FCF Beasts of Fan-Controlled Football (FCF). He was signed by the Green Bay Packers of the National Football League as an undrafted free agent in 2010. He played college football at Stillman College. 

He has also been a member of the Cleveland Browns and St. Louis Rams.

Professional career

St. Louis Rams
Porter appeared in 12 games for the St. Louis Rams in 2011.

Toronto Argonauts
Porter signed with the Toronto Argonauts of the Canadian Football League in 2013.

On September 21, 2013, Porter was released by the Argonauts.

Fan Controlled Football
After seven years out of football, Porter signed with Fan Controlled Football for its inaugural 2021 season. He is currently a running back for the Beasts. Porter would be franchise tagged by the Beasts in March 13, 2022.

References

1986 births
Living people
Players of American football from Los Angeles
American football running backs
Stillman Tigers football players
Cleveland Browns players
St. Louis Rams players
Toronto Argonauts players
Green Bay Packers players
Fan Controlled Football players